Roskill may refer to:
 Mount Roskill, a neighbourhood of Auckland, New Zealand
 Mount Roskill (New Zealand electorate), a House of Representatives electorate based on Mount Roskill
 Mount Roskill Grammar School, a secondary school in Mount Roskill
 Mount Roskill Intermediate, a middle school in Mount Roskill
 Puketāpapa, a volcano also known as Mount Roskill in Auckland, New Zealand
 Roskill (New Zealand electorate), a former parliamentary electorate, 1919–1996
 Roskill Commission on the Third London Airport, 1968–1971

People with the surname
 Eustace Roskill, Baron Roskill, chair of the Roskill Commission
 Stephen Roskill, Royal Navy officer and official historian of the navy in the Second World War

See also
Roskell, a surname
Roskelley, a surname